Więcław  (formerly German Bornhofen) is a village in the administrative district of Gmina Dębno, within Myślibórz County, West Pomeranian Voivodeship, in north-western Poland.

For the history of the region, see History of Pomerania.

The village has a population of 204.

References

Villages in Myślibórz County